Cesare Danova (March 1, 1926 – March 19, 1992) was an Italian television and screen actor. Best known for his roles in The Captain's Daughter (1947), Viva Las Vegas (1964), Chamber of Horrors (1966), Mean Streets (1973), and various roles in The Rifleman (1958-1963).

Life and career
Born as Cesare Deitinger in  Rome, Italy to an Austrian father and an Italian mother; he adopted Danova as his stage name after becoming an actor in Rome at the end of World War II. After the film Don Juan (1955) he immigrated to the United States. He was contracted to Metro-Goldwyn-Mayer in 1956.

His appearances include The Man Who Understood Women (1959). He tested for a part in Ben Hur, but his big break was the role of Apollodorus, Cleopatra's personal servant, in the 1963 film Cleopatra, directed by Joseph Mankiewicz and starring Elizabeth Taylor, Richard Burton and Rex Harrison. The original script called for a major role for Danova, who was to form a trio of Cleopatra's lovers alongside Harrison's Caesar and Burton's Marc Antony. Though a number of scenes featuring Taylor and Danova were shot, the script was revised and the role truncated as the Burton-Taylor affair made tabloid headlines. The following year Danova starred as Count Elmo Mancini in Viva Las Vegas as Elvis Presley's rival for both Ann-Margret and the Las Vegas Grand Prix. 

In 1967, Danova played the role of Actor in the TV series Garrison's Gorillas. The series only ran for 26 episodes. Two of his best roles were as the neighborhood mafia Don, Giovanni Cappa, in Martin Scorsese's Mean Streets (1973) and as the corrupt mayor of Faber, Carmine DePasto, in National Lampoon's Animal House (1978). He appeared in three episodes of The Rifleman, and regularly appeared as a guest star on numerous television series, including Honey West; The Man from U.N.C.L.E.; That Girl; Daniel Boone; Charlie's Angels; The Love Boat; Sanford and Son; Fantasy Island; Police Story; Murder, She Wrote; Airwolf; Hunter; Maude; The Rifleman; Mannix; Night Gallery; Falcon Crest; Hart to Hart; Mission: Impossible (1988–90); and his final television appearance in 1992 as Father DiMarco on In the Heat of the Night.

Death
Danova died of a heart attack on March 19, 1992, aged 66, at the Academy of Motion Picture Arts and Sciences headquarters in Los Angeles while attending a meeting of the Foreign Language Film committee.

Family
Danova was married twice and had two sons, Marco and Fabrizio, by his first wife, Pamela.

Selected filmography

 The Captain's Daughter (1947) – Piotr Andrejevich Grinev
 Monaca santa (1949) – Angelo De Blase
 Cavalcade of Heroes (1950) – Massimo Ruffo
 El final de una leyenda (1951) – Carlos Montaña
 The King's Mail (1951) – Marcos de Malta
 Repentance (1952) – Sandro
 The Black Mask (1952) – Villeneuve
 The Three Pirates (1952) – Il Corsaro Verde – Carlo di Ventimiglia
 Jolanda, the Daughter of the Black Corsair (1953)
 Cavallina storna (1953) – Sandro
 Balocchi e profumi (1953) – Lorenzo
 Processo contro ignoti (1953) – Avv. Enzo Pirani
 Crossed Swords (1954) – Raniero
 Loves of Three Queens (1954) – Count Siegfried (segment: I Cavalieri dell'illusione)
 I cavalieri dell'illusione (1954)
 Don Juan (1955) – Don Giovanni
 Non scherzare con le donne (1955)
 Incatenata dal destino (1956) – Kirk Mauri
 Ces sacrées vacances (1956) – Ralph Carigan
 The Rifleman (1958-1963) – Duel of Honor, Baranca, The Guest
 Tarzan, the Ape Man (1959) – Harry Holt
 The Man Who Understood Women (1959) – Major Marco Ranieri
 Catch Me If You Can (1959)
 Valley of the Dragons (1961) – Hector Servadac
 Tender Is the Night (1962) – Tommy Barban
 Cleopatra (1963) – Apollodorus
 Gidget Goes to Rome (1963) – Paolo Cellini
 Viva Las Vegas (1964) – Count Elmo Mancini
 Boy, Did I Get a Wrong Number! (1966) – Pepe Pepponi
 Chamber of Horrors (1966) – Anthony Draco
 Che! (1969) – Ramon Valdez
 Horowitz in Dublin (1973)
 Mean Streets (1973) – Giovanni
 A Matter of Wife... and Death (1975) – Dottore
 Scorchy (1976) – Philip Bianco
 Tentacles (1977) – John Corey
 The Astral Factor (1978) – Mario
 Animal House (1978) – Mayor Carmine DePasto

Notes

References

External links

 
 

1926 births
1992 deaths
American male film actors
American male television actors
Italian male film actors
Italian people of Austrian descent
Italian emigrants to the United States
Actors from Bergamo
20th-century American male actors
20th-century Italian male actors
Burials at Valley Oaks Memorial Park